Rakura is a tea brand from Himal Tea Industries, founded in 1973, a company from Nepal that launched Rakura in 2012. "Drink Health" is the company's tagline, which refers to tea as a health beneficiary drink.  It provides its product in an eco-friendly way such as its decomposable tea bag.

Himal Tea Industries Pvt Ltd is one of the oldest manufacturers of Nepali tea.

History 
The tea estate of was founded by Ram Kumar Rathi in the late 1970s. The brand has been formed from his name Ra-Ku-Ra.

References

External links
 
 Facebook Page https://www.facebook.com/Rakura.tea
 Twitter https://twitter.com/Rakuratea
 Global Fine, Flavor, Aroma trader - Himalayan Range Tea Industries Pvt. Ltd
 https://web.archive.org/web/20140316183533/http://www.dcnepal.us/news_nepali_archive.php?nid=96289 
 Rakura Archives - OnlineKhabar
 Rakura Heavenly Classics tea out - Worldnews.com
 Rakura launches seven types of tea - English-language media - Nepal - South Asian Free Media Association

Tea brands
Nepalese brands
Nepalese cuisine
Food and drink companies of Nepal
Nepalese tea
Tea companies
1973 establishments in Nepal